Euphorianthus is a genus of flowering plants belonging to the family Sapindaceae.

Its native range is Central Malesia to Vanuatu.

Species:
 Euphorianthus euneurus (Miq.) Leenh.

References

Sapindaceae
Sapindaceae genera